Make a Shadow is the second extended play (EP) and debut major-label release by American singer-songwriter Meg Myers. It was released on February 7, 2014 by Atlantic Records. It serves as her first release under a major label after signing to Atlantic in 2012. The first single from Make a Shadow, "Heart Heart Head", was released on April 30, 2013. The second and final single "Desire" was released on September 9, 2013.

Background
Myers originally released her debut EP Daughter in the Choir independently in March 2012. It garnered positive reviews from websites such as LA Weekly. Later that year, it was announced that she had signed with Atlantic Records.

Singles
"Heart Heart Head" was released as Myers' debut single and Make a Shadows lead single on April 30, 2013. Artist Direct rated the song five out of five stars, describing the track as an "inviting intensity" while praising Myers' vocals. The song's music video premiered the same day to positive reception. The magazine Complex described the music video as "well-reflected", while describing the song itself as "dark".

"Desire" was released on September 9, 2013 as the EP's second and final single. Miles Bowe of Stereogum gave a positive review of the song, stating that it "juggles the pretty and the ugly", while also praising Myers' vocals.

Track listing

Release history

Charts

References

2014 EPs
Meg Myers albums
Atlantic Records EPs